Affect regulation and "affect regulation theory" are important concepts in psychiatry and psychology and in close relation with emotion regulation. However, the latter is a reflection of an individual's mood status rather than their affect. Affect regulation is the actual performance one can demonstrate in a difficult situation regardless of what their mood or emotions are. It is tightly related to the quality of executive and cognitive functions and that is what distinguishes this concept from emotion regulation. One can have a low emotional control but a high level of control on his or her affect, and therefore, demonstrate a normal interpersonal functioning as a result of intact cognition.

See also
 Affect (psychology)
 Affect theory
 Affective
 Affective spectrum
 Emotional self-regulation

References

Emotions
Cognition